Honey Creek is a tributary of the Llano River, and an archaeological site located on the Edwards Plateau, between Grit  and Streeter, in  Mason County, Texas. The prehistoric midden site (41MS32) has been of interest to scientific research since 1987, when Glenn T. Goode of the Texas Department of Transportation uncovered it during an otherwise routine infrastructural project. Stephen L. Black and the Texas Archeological Research Laboratory included it in a wider study of burned-rock midden. Researchers have been able to date the midden at Honey Creek, used to bake native plants,  to having evolved 1110–1700 AD, and is the end result of an estimated 165 ovens used by hunter-gatherer bands over that six-century period. Texas A&M University archeobotanist Phil Dering identified 14 varieties of local plants in charred remains found. The oldest artifact found at the site is the "Martindale dart point" believed to date to 5000–6000 BC for hunting, but chipped and refashioned in later years to be used as a tool at the midden.

Further reading

See also
 Honey Creek (Texas)
 List of rivers of Texas

References

Archaeological sites in Texas
Rivers of Mason County, Texas
Rivers of Texas